The 2016–17 Superliga de Voleibol Masculina is the 53rd season since its establishment in 1965. The 2016–17 regular season started in October 2016 and finished on 29 April 2017.

Championship playoffs began on 7 April. Starting with semifinals, the two semifinal winners will advance to the Final to fight for the championship title to the best of three matches.

Ca'n Ventura Palma won its first ever title in his first season in Superliga after defeating defending champion Unicaja Almería 3–0 in the Championship Finals.

Competition format 
12 teams played in a round-robin format. Upon completion of regular season, the top four teams qualify for the playoffs, played in a best-of-5 games format, while two bottom teams are relegated to Superliga 2.

During regular season 3 points are awarded for a 3–0 or 3–1 win, while a 3–2 win means 2 points. Additionally, one points is given for any 2–3 loss.

Teams

Regular season standings

Championship playoff

All times are CEST, except for Canary Islands which is WEST.

Bracket
To best of five games.

Semifinals

Match 1

|}

Match 2

|}

Match 3

|}

Final

Match 1

|}

Match 2

|}

Match 3

|}
Final MVP:  Andrés Villena

Top scorers
(Regular season and playoff statistic combined.)

References

External links
Official website

2017 in men's volleyball
2016 in volleyball
Superliga de Voleibol Masculina 
2017 in Spanish sport  
2016 in Spanish sport
Spain